Prix Biennal may refer to:

Prix Biennal I, a horse race in Chantilly, France, presently titled the Prix Jean Prat
Prix Biennal II, a horse race in Paris, France, presently titled the Prix Vicomtesse Vigier